Frédéric Duplus (born 7 April 1990) is a French professional footballer who plays as a right-back.

Football career
Duplus has been with the Doubs-based side since 2002. He was a part of Sochaux's youth squad that won the Coupe Gambardella in 2007. He made his highly anticipated professional debut in Sochaux's third round 1–0 win over Olympique Marseille in the 2008–09 edition of the Coupe de la Ligue coming on as a substitute playing 11 minutes. He made his league debut on 29 October 2008 against Olympique Lyonnais, however he was substituted out after only playing 32 minutes. It was discovered that Duplus had in fact tore ligaments in one of his knees ruling the youngster out of both league and international play for up to six months. He returned to Sochaux for the 2009–10 season and was assigned the first team number 2 shirt.

On 11 August 2021, he signed a two-year contract with Mouscron in Belgian First Division B.

International career
Duplus was a member of the France squad that participated in the 2007 FIFA U-17 World Cup helping France reach the quarter-finals before being eliminated by Spain. He also played on the France U-19 team making his debut in the opening match of the 2008 Sendaï Cup.

Career statistics

References

External links
 LFP Profile

1990 births
Living people
Sportspeople from Belfort
Association football fullbacks
French footballers
France youth international footballers
FC Sochaux-Montbéliard players
Vannes OC players
En Avant Guingamp players
S.V. Zulte Waregem players
Oud-Heverlee Leuven players
Royal Excel Mouscron players
Belgian Pro League players
Challenger Pro League players
Ligue 1 players
Ligue 2 players
French expatriate footballers
Expatriate footballers in Belgium
French expatriate sportspeople in Belgium
Footballers from Bourgogne-Franche-Comté
SL16 FC players